Simone Cathrine Petersen (born 28 August 1997) is a Danish handball player who currently plays for Ikast Håndbold and the Danish national team.

She represented Denmark at the 2021 World Women's Handball Championship in Spain.

References

1997 births
Living people
People from Ringsted
Danish female handball players
Sportspeople from Region Zealand